The Nalu, also called Nalo, Nanum, or Nanu, are a West African ethnic group who are found in Guinea and Guinea Bissau. They speak the Nalu language. They have been described as "pre-Mandingas", as they settled in the region before the arrival of the Mandé peoples. In this respect Walter Rodney places them alongside the Landuma people, the Baga people, and the Temne people.

The Simo is a West African secret society which is active amongst the Nalu and related people.

References

Ethnic groups in Guinea
Ethnic groups in Guinea-Bissau